Dongdaemun History & Culture Park is a station on Line 2, Line 4 and Line 5 of the Seoul Metropolitan Subway. The huge Dongdaemun Market district is centered on this station and Dongdaemun Station, located to the north across Cheonggyecheon.

The Line 2 station is located in Euljiro-7-ga, Jung-gu, Seoul, and the Line 4 and 5 stations are located in Gwanghui-dong, Jung-gu, Seoul.

This station is also known to have the highest train-platform gap related accidents in the entire country of South Korea with the total of 365 feet accidents each year.

This station's Line 5 Transfer passageway was closed from 18 July 2018 to 20 September 2018 because of construction-related work.

Vicinity
Exit 1 : Dongdaemun Design Plaza & Park
Exit 2 : Hanyang Middle & Technical High Schools
Exit 13 : National Medical Center
Exit 14 : Cheonggyecheon

The headquarters of South Korean food company CJ Cheil Jedang is in the CJ Cheiljedang Building in Ssangnim-dong, Jung-gu, nearby to the station.

References

Seoul Metropolitan Subway stations
Metro stations in Jung District, Seoul
Railway stations opened in 1983
Seoul Subway Line 2
Seoul Subway Line 4
Seoul Subway Line 5
1983 establishments in South Korea
20th-century architecture in South Korea